"Gwine to Run All Night, or De Camptown Races" (popularly known simply as "Camptown Races") is a minstrel song by Stephen Foster (1826–1864). It was published in February 1850 by F. D. Benteen of Baltimore, Maryland, and Benteen published a different version with guitar accompaniment in 1852 under the title "The Celebrated Ethiopian Song/Camptown Races". The song quickly entered the realm of popular Americana. Louis Moreau Gottschalk (1829–1869) quotes the melody in his virtuoso piano work  Grotesque Fantasie, the Banjo, op. 15 published in 1855. In 1909, composer Charles Ives incorporated the tune and other vernacular American melodies into his orchestral Symphony No. 2.

First stanza

Reception 

Richard Jackson was curator of the Americana Collection at New York Public Library; he writes:

Foster quite specifically tailored the song for use on the minstrel stage. He composed it as a piece for solo voice with group interjections and refrain ... his dialect verses have all the wild exaggeration and rough charm of folk tale as well as some of his most vivid imagery ... Together with "Oh! Susanna", "Camptown Races" is one of the gems of the minstrel era."

In The Americana Song Reader, William Emmett Studwell writes that the song was introduced by the Christy Minstrels, noting that Foster's "nonsense lyrics are much of the charm of this bouncy and enduring bit of Americana", and the song was a big hit with minstrel troupes throughout the country. Foster's music was used for derivatives that include "Banks of the Sacramento", "A Capital Ship" (1875), and a pro-Lincoln parody introduced during the 1860 presidential campaign.

Richard Crawford observes in America's Musical Life that the song resembles Dan Emmett's "Old Dan Tucker", and he suggests that Foster used Emmett's piece as a model. Both songs feature contrast between a high instrumental register with a low vocal one, comic exaggeration, hyperbole, verse and refrain, call and response, and syncopation. However, Foster's melody is "jaunty and tuneful" while Emmett's is "driven and aggressive". Crawford points out that the differences in the two songs represent two different musical styles, as well as a shift in minstrelsy from the rough spirit and "muscular, unlyrical music" of the 1840s, to a more genteel spirit and lyricism with an expanding repertoire that included sad songs, sentimental and love songs, and parodies of opera. Crawford explains that, by mid-century, the "noisy, impromptu entertainments" characteristic of Dan Emmett and the Virginia Minstrels were passé and the minstrel stage was changing to a "restrained and balanced kind of spectacle".

Historians cite the village of Camptown, Pennsylvania as the basis for the song, located in the mountains of northeast Pennsylvania. The races were resumed nearby in 1965 as a footrace, without horses. The Pennsylvania Historical Society confirmed that Foster traveled through the small town and afterwards wrote the song. The Bradford County Historical Society documents Foster attending school in nearby Towanda and Athens in 1840 and 1841. The current annual running of the Camptown Races was replaced by a  track covering rough lumbering trails.

The song was the impetus for renaming Camptown, a village of Clinton Township, Essex County, New Jersey. When the new ballad was published in 1850, some residents of the village were mortified to be associated with the bawdiness in song. The wife of the local postmaster suggested Irvington, to commemorate writer Washington Irving, which was adopted in 1852.

Recordings 
In one of the most widely familiar uses of "Camptown Races" in popular culture, the Looney Tunes and Merrie Melodies cartoon character Foghorn Leghorn frequently hums the tune to himself (breaking into song only for the "Doo-Dah" refrain) in most of the 28 cartoons the character appears in, produced between 1946 and 1963. Occasionally, he would also sing his own lyrics if they were related to what he was doing at the moment. Leghorn was not based on a minstrel character, but on Kenny Delmar's popular radio character, the overbearing Southerner Senator Claghorn.

The song was revived on a number of occasions in the twentieth century with recordings by Bing Crosby (recorded December 9, 1940), Johnny Mercer (1945), Al Jolson (recorded July 17, 1950), Julie London (included in her album Swing Me an Old Song – 1959), and Frankie Laine (included in his album Deuces Wild – 1961).

Country music singer Kenny Rogers recorded the song in 1970 with his group, The First Edition, on their album Tell It All Brother under the title of "Camptown Ladies".

In popular culture 

 "Two World Wars and One World Cup" is a football song sung by supporters of the England national football team to the tune of "Camptown Races" as part of the England–Germany football rivalry.
 The song was quoted briefly in the background music in a segment from the 2020 Summer Olympics opening ceremony where 50 Olympic pictograms were depicted by actors in blue suits. "Camptown Races" is briefly heard when depicting the pictograms for the Equestrian events; Dressage, Eventing, and Jumping.

Film 
 1938 Holiday – played on banjo by Lew Ayres and sung by Lew Ayres, Katharine Hepburn, Jean Dixon and Edward Everett Horton.
 1939 Swanee River – sung by Al Jolson
 1950 Riding High – sung by Bing Crosby, Coleen Gray, Clarence Muse, and children
 1952  O. Henry's Full House is an anthology film wherein the second segment, "The Clarion Call", based on O Henry's 1908 short story of the same name, has a plot involving a Yonkers detective (played by Dale Robertson) tracking down a murderer (played by Richard Widmark) with the only clue being a golden pencil inscribed with the words "Camptown Races".  The song is sung by Widmark.  This segment is directed by Henry Hathaway.
 1974 Blazing Saddles - sung by Lyle
 1978 Sweet Savage - X-rated movie in the style of a Western
 1982 Creepshow - instrumental only at a slower tempo during the segment "Something to Tide You Over"
 1987 The Stepfather whistled by Jerry Blake (Terry O'Quinn)
 1989 Stepfather II (aka Stepfather II:Make Room for Daddy), whistled by Jerry Blake/Dr Gene Clifford (Terry O'Quinn), Todd Grayland (Jonathan Brandis) and Sam Watkins (John O'Leary)
 1992 Stepfather III, aka Stepfather III : Father's Day, whistled by Keith Grant (Robert Wightman)
 1997 Waiting for Guffman – sung by Eugene Levy's character, Dr. Allan Pearl
 1999 Passion – sung by two characters then played on piano by Richard Roxburgh.
 2004 The Spongebob Squarepants Movie - heard briefly when the Goofy Goober's restaurant appears.
 2006 Night at the Museum
 2010 The King's Speech – sung by Colin Firth and Geoffrey Rush.

Television 
 1948 Screen Songs appears in the episode "Camptown Races." The episode depicts a cartoon blackface minstrel show with anthropomorphic animals who sing an altered version of the song.
 1955-1975 Gunsmoke  (TV series) background jingle playing in several episodes on the player piano inside the Long Branch saloon
 1996 Lisa the Iconoclast sung by Chief Wiggum
 2000 Disney's Recess in episode "Old Folks Home" (S4E23A), Mikey sings this song
 2012 Dance Like Nobody's Watching (30 Rock) (S6E1) sung by a contestant on the fictional show America's Kidz Got Singing during the final scene of the episode
 Michael Scott sings this in season 5, episode 9 of The Office.
 In Camp Lazlo, Camp Kidney's Bean Scout Chorus sings it, burping some of the lyrics. Lazlo has trouble with his part, burping "bay".
 In Brickleberry, it was sung by Ethel Anderson while dressed in blackface in season 2, episode 7, "My Way or the Highway".
 In Supernatural season 13, Episode 5, Lucifer sings the song to Rowen in order to anger her.

References

External links 

 "Camptown Races" by Billy Murray and chorus (1911), sung in the minstrel style

1850 songs
American folk songs
Blackface minstrel songs
Songs written by Stephen Foster
Public domain music
Songs about horses